The Sooty Show is a British children's television series, created by Harry Corbett, and produced for the BBC from 1955 to 1967, and then for ITV from 1968 until 1992. The show, part of the Sooty franchise, focuses on the mischievous adventures of the glove puppet character of the same name, alongside his friends Sweep and Soo, and their handler. Between 1955 and 1975, Corbett presented the programme until his retirement, before it was taken over by his son Matthew Corbett. It also co-starred Marjorie Corbett as the voice of Soo from the character's debut in 1964, until her retirement in 1981, whereupon Brenda Longman replaced her.

The show originally focused on a sketch-based format featuring slapstick comedy, music, and stories, along with additional puppet characters, and later the incorporation of a studio audience. In 1981, Matthew changed the format towards a sitcom setting, in which he and the characters lived within a country cottage and engaged in a new adventure in each episode. The new arrangement retained some elements from the original format such as songs, while introducing narration in a number of scenes featuring the puppets only. In both formats, guests are featured in episodes, alongside the involvement of prop items for gunging and making messes of human performers and guest stars.

The Sooty Show proved a success with children's television, due to the popularity of Sooty, spawning additional sequels including Sooty & Co. in 1993, as well as several stage shows, and a spin-off educational series titled Learn With Sooty. The programme itself was later made available on VHS and DVD, featuring episodes from primarily the 1980s to 1990s.

History
The Sooty Show was created by Harry Corbett, a children's entertainer and magician, following the popularity of his puppet character Sooty on children's television and the decision by BBC Television to commission him for several episodes featuring the character. Corbett hosted several episodes for the BBC, originally under the title of Sooty, before later renaming it to the title that would be use throughout its broadcast history, along with creating additional characters that would become key elements to the children's media franchise sharing the character's name. In 1967, Corbett fell into disagreement with BBC producers over the presentation of the programme, and with the decision by Paul Fox, BBC1 controller at thet time, to cancel the programme, he signed a deal with ITV to move The Sooty Show to their channel. Production was handled by Thames Television shortly after its return in 1968, with Corbett presenting the programme until he was forced to retire in 1976, with his son Matthew Corbett presenting the programme until its conclusion in 1992, when Thames lost its franchise.

Format
The Sooty Show featured three different formats during its broadcast history: two created by Harry Corbett, the programme's creator; and the third by Harry's son, Matthew Corbett. The first format, used from the programme's premiere in 1955, functioned in the manner of a cartoon short. In this arrangement, Harry would detail a scenario to viewers that Sooty was undertaking, that would often go wrong and cause chaos, often for Harry. The plots devised for these episodes were influenced by societal values, current events and the development of new technologies, tailored towards amusing young children, and made use of slapstick humour, including the use of cream pies and water. As episodes progressed, stories under this format later saw the involvement of Sweep and Soo, whom Harry created to accompany Sooty, alongside other puppet characters.

The second format, devised in the mid-1960s, expanded episodes to consist of a series of sketches involving Sooty and his friends, but with the inclusion of a studio, and a live audience of young children at each filming session. In this arrangement, harry was able to incorporate additional elements, including music, story-telling, magic tricks and guest stars alongside the comedic sketches. The format was maintained by Harry when the programme moved from the BBC to ITV in 1968, and later by Matthew, upon becoming a regular in 1974, after taking over from his father following his retirement in 1976, though with Harry retaining a guest capacity in episodes.

The third format used by the programme was introduced by Matthew in 1981, later becoming a staple for all future programmes in the Sooty franchise. Under the new format, Matthew discontinued the use of a studio audience and comedic sketches, in lieu of a sitcom format focused on a single misadventure, with himself, Sooty, Sweep and Soo sharing a suburban house together. Elements of the previous format, such as guest stars and music, were retained, with narration added in for scenes focused entirely on the puppets; story-telling was also retained, but phased out over the 1980s. The new format included the use of educational elements in some stories, and the creation of specially designed sets for the puppet characters, which would be later updated and maintained in subsequent programmes in the Sooty franchise – in particular, a bathroom set created for the programme was specially designed so that its miniature taps and shower dispensed running water.

Cast

Presenters 
 Harry Corbett (1955–1975) – The show's first presenter and the creator of Sooty. Corbett ran the programme mostly within a sketch-based format throughout his era, later creating the characters of Sweep and Soo to accompany the show. His most notable contribution to the show, aside from the puppet characters, was the catchphrase he used to conclude an episode's run, which would continue to be used by his successors – "Bye bye, everybody. Bye bye." Harry returned to the programme as a guest star during his son Matthew's era, and was knighted with an OBE for his contributions with the programme and characters following his retirement.
 Matthew Corbett (1976–1992) – The show's second presenter. Matthew took over in 1976, having initially worked in children's television, and maintained the same format as his father up until 1981. After the show's format was changed to a sitcom-based arrangement, Matthew transformed himself on screen into a well-meaning father figure, but also a somewhat sarcastic character who was slightly conceited with pomposity and boasting, to complement the mayhem created by Sooty and Sweep.
 Marjorie Corbett (1964–1981) – The first voice of Soo, whom her husband Harry had created as a talking female panda. She remained a part of the show until after the first series of the format change. According to Brenda Longman, who took over the voice of Soo, the reason Marjorie was replaced was because her heavy smoking caused her to be short of breath. It was also felt that she made Soo sound too old.
 Brenda Longman (1981–1992) – The second voice of Soo starting from the second series of the format change, following Marjorie's retirement from the role, who also made frequent guest appearances as various characters within the show's sitcom format. Longman remained with the programme until its conclusion and continued to work with Matthew and his successor Richard Cadell on subsequent sequels of The Sooty Show and other Sooty productions in the same role.

Puppet characters
 Sooty – A mute yellow male bear, and the protagonist of the show alongside its human presenters. The show introduced his trademark traits of tapping a surface to whisper into the presenter's ear what he wishes to say, owning a magic wand, the use of his magic words "Izzy wizzy, let's get busy!", and his fondness for using a water pistol.
 Sweep – A grey male dog, and Sooty's best friend, who was created in 1957. His trademark voice of bizarre squeaks was achieved by his original puppeteer Leslie Corbett, through a reed from a saxophone in his mouth to create the sounds.
 Soo – A calm and collected female panda with a normal human voice, who was created in 1964. The character's design was towards being a foil for both Sooty and Sweep, but with a motherly-like nature to her personality. She was originally voiced by Harry's wife Marjorie Corbett until 1981, whereupon after the show's format changed, she was voiced by Brenda Longman until the show's conclusion in 1992.
 Butch – A dark brown male dog, like Sweep, but able to talk. Introduced by Harry Corbett in the early 1970s, the character was withdrawn by his son Matthew in 1980, returning to guest star in the role of a villain.
 Mr. Woof – A Yorkshire terrier who is a friend of Sweep, he barks in communication, eats, and sleeps.
 Ramsbottom – A brown male snake who spoke in a deep Yorkshire accent and had the habit of telling convoluted stories and ditties. The character was created by Harry Corbett but retired by his son Matthew. He was originally voiced by Bill Garrett, the company model and prop maker who used his own strong Yorkshire accent and made the original puppet.
 Little Cousin Scampi – A mute white bear and Sooty's cousin. The character was created by Matthew Corbett and introduced in Series 15 episode of the same name in 1990 and was designed to be a mischievous bear who liked pranks, making inventions, and caring for mice. The character became a regular member of the puppet characters from 1991, and beyond the programme's conclusion in 1992.

Episodes

Legacy
The Sooty Show proved popular with children and helped to develop the Sooty franchise, culminating in the formation of additional television programmes that would run on the format brought in by Matthew Corbett in the 1980s. After the programme's conclusion, it was followed with a sequel in 1993, titled Sooty & Co.. The programme also spawned an educational spin-off series for young children, titled Learn with Sooty, that was produced for the direct-to-video market between 1989 and 1991, and several stage shows involving the puppets, Matthew, and Connie Creighton. Its early success led to it receiving a short-run comic strip based on the character, for the children's magazine Playhour between 1960 and 1961, drawn by Gordon Hutchings.

Outside the UK, the show was also given international broadcasts in other countries: these included ABC in Australia; TVNZ in New Zealand; and the American Broadcasting Company (ABC) in the United States.

UK home media releases

Also, in January 2008, a promotional DVD containing 5 early-1980s episodes was distributed by The Times newspaper, for Fremantle Media. The episodes featured were: "Bob a Job"; "Safety First"; "Sleep Walking"; "Connie Comes to Tea"; and "Sooty's Christmas Panto''.

References

External links
 

1950s British children's television series
1960s British children's television series
1970s British children's television series
1980s British children's television series
1990s British children's television series
1950s British comedy television series
1960s British comedy television series
1970s British comedy television series
1980s British comedy television series
1990s British comedy television series
1955 British television series debuts
1992 British television series endings
BBC children's television shows
BBC television comedy
British children's comedy television series
British children's musical television series
British television shows featuring puppetry
English-language television shows
ITV children's television shows
ITV comedy
Lost BBC episodes
Television series about bears
Television series by FremantleMedia Kids & Family
Television series by Fremantle (company)
Television shows produced by Thames Television
Television shows adapted into comics
Sooty
Television shows shot at Teddington Studios